Erik Bottcher (born May 9, 1980) is an American politician from New York City. He is a Democratic member of the 3rd district of the New York City Council, which includes the neighborhoods of Greenwich Village, Chelsea, and Hell's Kitchen.

Early life and education
Bottcher was raised in Wilmington, New York, a small town in the Adirondack Mountains located outside of Lake Placid. His parents owned and operated a fly fishing motel called, “The Hungry Trout.” 

As an adolescent, Bottcher suffered from depression and struggled to come to terms with his sexual orientation. At the age of 15 and following a number of suicide attempts, he was admitted to Four Winds Hospital, a mental health facility in Saratoga Springs, New York. 

After graduating from Lake Placid High School, Bottcher wrote an open letter to the school board sharing his experiences with bullying he endured at the school and why the district needed to do more to protect their students. Shortly thereafter, the school district added “Sexual Orientation” to its non-discrimination policy. These early experiences are often credited by Bottcher as the beginning of his political activism.

He received his Bachelor of Arts degree from George Washington University.

Career
After college, Bottcher moved to Manhattan and held a number of jobs in various industries throughout his 20s, including a traffic coordinator at an advertising firm, a production assistant in the packaging design department of Colgate Palmolive, and as a realtor at the Corcoran Group.

Bottcher began his formal politics work in 2009, when he joined the staff of the New York City Council as the body's LGBT and HIV/AIDS community liaison. At the Council, he worked on issues including hate crimes, transgender rights, bullying in schools, and the fight for marriage equality in New York State. 

Bottcher soon joined the governor’s office as the LGBTQ liaison and in that role he assisted the successful 2011 effort to pass marriage equality in New York. In 2015, Bottcher re-entered city politics as chief of staff to Council member (and soon-to-be City Council Speaker) Corey Johnson, where he remained until his own City Council campaign.

2021 City Council campaign
In February 2020, Bottcher announced he would run to succeed the term-limited Johnson for the 3rd district of the City Council in 2021. Running with Johnson's support, Bottcher quickly became the district's frontrunner, raising more money than all but four other candidates across the city and accruing endorsements from nearly every major union and local elected official.

During the campaign, Bottcher released an extensive policy platform to address the crisis of serious mental illness, New York City’s sanitation concerns, and increasing employment opportunities for residents of public housing and those living in poverty.

On election night on June 22, Bottcher resoundingly led the field with 47 percent of first-choice votes, and declared victory that night; when absentee ballots and ranked-choice votes were counted two weeks later, Bottcher officially defeated runner-up Arthur Schwartz 71-29%. He faced no opposition in the November general election.

Harassment 

On December 17, New York City Council Bottcher attended a Drag Story Hour event that was targeted by about 20 anti-LGBT protestors. On December 19, two protestors associated with Guardians of Divinity and Gays Against Groomers, Erica Sanchez and D'Anna Morgan, were arrested for entering Bottcher's building and refusing to leave before eventually doing so. The protestors also defaced the sidewalk outside of his apartment with graffiti calling him a pedophile and using slurs such as "groomer". The group also entered and vandalized his nearby office building. David Nieves, a leading member of Guardians of Divinity, was arrested for assaulting Bottcher's neighbor, a 52-year-old man who had been walking his dog, who he harassed, struck in the face causing him to bleed, and then pushed into a car.

Personal life
Bottcher lives in Chelsea. He is gay, and has been open about his struggles with suicide when he was a closeted high schooler.

References

Living people
1980 births
People from Chelsea, Manhattan
Politicians from Manhattan
Gay politicians
LGBT people from New York (state)
New York (state) Democrats
21st-century American politicians
American LGBT city council members